Hans Schlenck (born 14 March 1901 in Bischofsheim an der Rhön – 13 November 1944) was a German stage and film actor. He died in World War II.

Filmography

External links

1901 births
1944 deaths
German male film actors
German male stage actors
People from Rhön-Grabfeld
20th-century German male actors
German military personnel killed in World War II